John Fassel (born January 10, 1974) is an American football coach who is the special teams coordinator for the Dallas Cowboys of the National Football League (NFL). He was previously the special teams coordinator and interim head coach for the Los Angeles Rams. He also served as a special teams coach for the Baltimore Ravens and Oakland Raiders.

Playing career

College
Fassel prepped for two years at Milford Academy in New Berlin, New York before attending the University of the Pacific in Stockton, California, where he played on the Pacific Tigers football team before they dropped their program in December 1995. He then played wide receiver at Weber State University and, following graduation, spent time as an undrafted rookie free agent for the Indianapolis Colts in the preseason of the 1999 season.

Coaching career

Oakland Raiders
On January 17, 2009, Oakland Raiders owner Al Davis promoted Fassel to special teams coordinator after Brian Schneider took a job with Pete Carroll at USC.

At the end of the 2011 NFL season, the Oakland Raiders fired head coach Hue Jackson and the entire coaching staff, including Fassel. During the season, Fassel had three special teams players (K Sebastian Janikowski, P Shane Lechler, and LS Jon Condo) selected to the 2012 Pro Bowl.

St. Louis/Los Angeles Rams

On February 1, 2012, the St. Louis Rams announced the hiring of Fassel as their special teams coordinator. Fassel took a lead role in developing the talents of kicker Greg Zuerlein, punter and holder Johnny Hekker and long snapper Jake McQuaide. Together, Zuerlein, Hekker, and McQuaide have combined for seven Pro Bowl appearances and remained together as a unit for seven seasons going into the 2019 season. Under Fassel's guidance, Rams players earned NFC Special Teams Player of the Week honors 15 times. On December 12, 2016, Fassel was announced as the interim head coach for the Los Angeles Rams, after the firing of Jeff Fisher. On January 13, 2017, the day after being hired, new head coach Sean McVay invited Fassel to remain on the Rams coaching staff.

Dallas Cowboys
On January 7, 2020, Fassel was hired by the Dallas Cowboys as their special teams coordinator.

Personal life
Fassel, who is of German descent, and his wife Elizabeth have two daughters, Lilah and Avery.

He is known by the nickname "Bones" He is also the son of former NFL head coach Jim Fassel.

On July 26, 2015, Fassel rescued a surfer who was drowning in the ocean in Manhattan Beach, California.

Head coaching record

College

Professional

*Interim head coach

References

External links
 Dallas Cowboys profile 

1974 births
Living people
American football wide receivers
Amsterdam Admirals coaches
Baltimore Ravens coaches
Bucknell Bison football coaches
Dallas Cowboys coaches
Los Angeles Rams coaches
Los Angeles Rams head coaches
New Mexico Highlands Cowboys football coaches
Oakland Raiders coaches
Pacific Tigers football players
St. Louis Rams coaches
Weber State Wildcats football players
Players of American football from Anaheim, California